This is a list of members of the National Parliament of Papua New Guinea from 2007 to 2012, as elected at the 2007 election.

Notes

References

List
Papua New Guinea politics-related lists